Winthrop Graham (born 17 November 1965 in Westmoreland, Jamaica) is a retired  athlete who mainly competed in the 400 metres hurdles. He won two Olympic medals and three World Championship medals.

His personal best time was 47.60 seconds, achieved in August 1993 at the Zurich Weltklasse meet where he beat Samuel Matete and Kevin Young. This was also the Jamaican record.

He is married to Yvonne Mai-Graham, a former East German international distance runner.

Collegiately, he competed for the Texas Longhorns.

International competitions

References

Sporting Heroes

1965 births
Living people
People from Westmoreland Parish
Jamaican male hurdlers
Jamaican male sprinters
Olympic athletes of Jamaica
Olympic silver medalists for Jamaica
Athletes (track and field) at the 1988 Summer Olympics
Athletes (track and field) at the 1992 Summer Olympics
Athletes (track and field) at the 1996 Summer Olympics
Pan American Games medalists in athletics (track and field)
Athletes (track and field) at the 1987 Pan American Games
Competitors at the 1986 Central American and Caribbean Games
World Athletics Championships athletes for Jamaica
World Athletics Championships medalists
Texas Longhorns men's track and field athletes
Medalists at the 1992 Summer Olympics
Medalists at the 1988 Summer Olympics
Olympic silver medalists in athletics (track and field)
Pan American Games gold medalists for Jamaica
Goodwill Games medalists in athletics
Central American and Caribbean Games gold medalists for Jamaica
Central American and Caribbean Games medalists in athletics
Competitors at the 1990 Goodwill Games
Competitors at the 1994 Goodwill Games
Medalists at the 1987 Pan American Games
20th-century Jamaican people
21st-century Jamaican people